Protoelongata loyaltyensis is a species of sea snail, a marine gastropod mollusk, in the family Costellariidae, the ribbed miters.

Description
The length of the shell attains 13 mm.

Distribution
This marine species occurs off Lifou, Loyalty Islands.

References

External links
 Hervier, J. "Descriptions d'especes nouvelles de mollusques, provenant de l'Archipel de la Nouvelle-Caledonie (suite)." Journ. de Conchyl. 46 (1897): 3a.

Costellariidae